Agrotis gladiaria, the swordsman dart or claybacked cutworm, is a moth of the family Noctuidae. It is found in south-eastern Canada from Nova Scotia to Ontario and in the United States from Maine to the panhandle of Florida, west to eastern Texas, eastern Kansas, eastern Nebraska, southern Wisconsin and Michigan.

The length of the forewings is 13–16 mm. Adults are on wing from September to October depending on the location.

The larvae feed on a wide range of plants, including Medicago sativa, Asteraceae, Fabaceae, Rubus, Poa, Andropogon, Brassica oleracea, Trifolium, Zea mays, Solidago, Hordeum pusillum, Avena, Allium, Ipomoea batatas, Nicotiana and Solanum lycopersicum.

External links
species info

Agrotis
Moths of North America
Moths described in 1875